Loc-Eguiner-Saint-Thégonnec is a former commune in the Finistère department of Brittany in north-western France. On 1 January 2016, it was merged into the new commune Saint-Thégonnec Loc-Eguiner.

Population
Inhabitants of Loc-Eguiner-Saint-Thégonnec are called in French
Éguinériens.

See also
Communes of the Finistère department

References

Former communes of Finistère